The Kaberry Baronetcy, of Adel cum Eccup in the City of Leeds, is a title in the Baronetage of the United Kingdom. It was created on 28 January 1960 for the Conservative politician Donald Kaberry. In 1983 he was further honoured when he was created a life peer as Baron Kaberry of Adel, of Adel in the City of Leeds, in the Peerage of the United Kingdom. The life barony became extinct on his death while he was succeeded in the baronetcy by his eldest son, the second and (as of 2010) present holder of the title.

Kaberry baronets, of Adel cum Eccup (1960)
The Right Honourable Sir Donald Kaberry, 1st Baronet and Baron Kaberry of Adel (1907–1991) (created Baron Kaberry of Adel in 1983)
The Honourable Sir Christopher Donald "Kit" Kaberry, 2nd Baronet (born 1943)

Arms

Notes

References

Kidd, Charles, Williamson, David (editors). Debrett's Peerage and Baronetage (1990 edition). New York: St Martin's Press, 1990, 

Kaberry